Beyond the Walls (MeAhorei HaSoragim, lit. "Behind the Bars") is a 1984 Israeli film directed by Uri Barbash and written by his brother Benny Barbash and Eran Preis. It was nominated for the Academy Award for Best Foreign Language Film.

Plot
The story takes place in the high-security block of the central Israel Prison Service jail. Uri and Issam are the leaders of the Israeli and Palestinian prisoner groups, respectively. After a musical performance in the prison, a row breaks out between Hoffman, a Jewish inmate, and a Palestinian. When Hoffman is killed, the security officer initiates a fight between the sides, pinning the blame for the murder on Issam's cell. Doron, the only Jewish prisoner in the Arab cell, is asked to sign a document implicating Issam in the crime, but refuses and commits suicide. He leaves a note saying that his cell was not responsible for the crime. As a result, Uri and Issam begin a general hunger strike, and make personal sacrifices in order not to break it.

Characters
Uri (Arnon Zadok) is serving his second sentence for armed robbery, and has been a criminal from a young age. He is the leader of all Jewish prisoners in his cellblock.
Issam (Muhammad Bakri) is a Fatah terrorist who turns moderate in prison. He is the leader of the Palestinian cell.
Asaf (Asi Dayan) is a former IDF officer sentenced for contacting a PLO agent in Europe. He is initially disliked and distrusted by both sides, but normalizes his relations with Uri.
"The Songbird" (Boaz Sharabi) is a talented singer and musician from Uri's cell, and the first prisoner to participate in a national music festival in Israel.

See also
 List of submissions to the 57th Academy Awards for Best Foreign Language Film
 List of Israeli submissions for the Academy Award for Best Foreign Language Film

References

External links

1984 films
1984 drama films
1980s Hebrew-language films
Israeli–Palestinian conflict films
Israeli crime drama films
1985 drama films
1985 films
Films set in prison
1980s crime drama films